The Jenkins Commission was the European Commission that held office from 6 January 1977 to 6 January 1981. Its President was Roy Jenkins.

Work
It was the successor to the Ortoli Commission and was succeeded by the Thorn Commission. Despite stagnating growth and a higher energy bill, the Jenkins Commission oversaw the development of the Economic and Monetary Union of the European Union from 1977, which began in 1979 as the European Monetary System, a forerunner of the Single Currency or euro. President Jenkins was the first President to attend a G8 summit on behalf of the Community.

Membership

Summary by political leanings 
The colour of the row indicates the approximate political leaning of the office holder using the following scheme:

References

External links
 European commission website
 PDF Archive of Commission Membership
 PDF Analysis of Political Experience of Commission Membership by UK politician Tom King and the Centre for Policy Studies

 
European Commissions
1977 establishments in Europe
1981 disestablishments

nl:Lijst van Europese Commissies